David Myers (born 30 June 1989) is a former professional Australian rules footballer who played for the Essendon Football Club in the Australian Football League (AFL).

AFL career
Myers is originally from Perth in the WAFL, he also attended Wesley College, Perth.

Myers, along with 33 other Essendon players, was found guilty of using a banned performance-enhancing substance, thymosin beta-4, as part of Essendon's sports supplements program during the 2012 season. He and his team-mates were initially found not guilty in March 2015 by the AFL Anti-Doping Tribunal, but a guilty verdict was returned in January 2016 after an appeal by the World Anti-Doping Agency. He was suspended for two years which, with backdating, ended in November 2016; as a result, he served approximately fourteen months of his suspension and missed the entire 2016 AFL season. The suspension lead to speculation that Myers would exercise his rights as an unrestricted free agent and leave Essendon, but during the year he signed a three-year contract to remain with Essendon until the end of the 2019 season. Myers announced his retirement at the end of the 2019 season with an open letter to the fans.

Statistics
 Statistics are correct to end of the 2015 season.

|- style="background-color: #EAEAEA"
! scope="row" style="text-align:center" | 2008
|  || 23 || 8 || 1 || 0 || 77 || 39 || 116 || 29 || 24 || 0.1 || 0.0 || 9.6 || 4.9 || 14.5 || 3.6 || 3.0
|- 
! scope="row" style="text-align:center" | 2009
|  || 23 || 6 || 1 || 3 || 37 || 29 || 66 || 19 || 8 || 0.2 || 0.5 || 6.2 || 4.8 || 11.0 || 3.2 || 1.3
|- style="background-color: #EAEAEA"
! scope="row" style="text-align:center" | 2010
|  || 23 || 8 || 3 || 3 || 71 || 62 || 133 || 27 || 24 || 0.4 || 0.4 || 8.9 || 7.8 || 16.6 || 3.4 || 3.0
|- 
! scope="row" style="text-align:center" | 2011
|  || 23 || 14 || 2 || 4 || 155 || 111 || 266 || 56 || 31 || 0.1 || 0.3 || 11.1 || 7.9 || 19.0 || 4.0 || 2.2
|- style="background-color: #EAEAEA"
! scope="row" style="text-align:center" | 2012
|  || 23 || 9 || 4 || 4 || 102 || 54 || 156 || 32 || 18 || 0.4 || 0.4 || 11.3 || 6.0 || 17.3 || 3.6 || 2.0
|- 
! scope="row" style="text-align:center" | 2013
|  || 23 || 20 || 10 || 10 || 220 || 147 || 367 || 86 || 68 || 0.5 || 0.5 || 11.0 || 7.4 || 18.4 || 4.3 || 3.4
|- style="background-color: #EAEAEA"
! scope="row" style="text-align:center" | 2014
|  || 23 || 18 || 5 || 7 || 209 || 168 || 377 || 64 || 75 || 0.3 || 0.4 || 11.6 || 9.3 || 20.9 || 3.6 || 4.2
|- 
! scope="row" style="text-align:center" | 2015
|  || 23 || 2 || 0 || 0 || 15 || 8 || 23 || 5 || 0 || 0.0 || 0.0 || 7.5 || 4.0 || 11.5 || 2.5 || 0.0
|- style="background-color: #EAEAEA"
! scope="row" style="text-align:center" | 2016
|  || 23 || 0 || 0 || 0 || 0 || 0 || 0 || 0 || 0 || 0.0 || 0.0 || 0 || 0 || 0 || 0 || 0.0
|- 
! scope="row" style="text-align:center" | 2017
|  || 23 || 15 || 3 || 6 || 129 || 147 || 276 || 41 || 39 || 0.2 || 0.4 || 8.6 || 9.8 || 18.4 || 2.7 || 2.6
|- style="background-color: #EAEAEA"
! scope="row" style="text-align:center" | 2018
|  || 23 || 16 || 10 || 5 || 182 || 147 || 329 || 53 || 61 || 0.6 || 0.3 || 11.4 || 9.2 || 20.6 || 3.3 || 3.8
|- 
! scope="row" style="text-align:center" | 2019
|  || 23 || 6 || 1 || 2 || 45 || 48 || 93 || 12 || 17 || 0.2 || 0.3 || 7.5 || 8.0 || 15.5 || 2.0 || 2.8
|- 
|- class="sortbottom"
! colspan=3| Career
! 122
! 40
! 44
! 1242
! 960
! 2202
! 424
! 365
! 0.3
! 0.4
! 10.2
! 7.9
! 18.0
! 3.5
! 3.0
|}
Did not play in 2016 as he was one of the seventeen still-active AFL players who missed the 2016 season as a result of the Essendon Football Club supplements saga investigation.

References

External links

 

1989 births
Living people
Australian rules footballers from Western Australia
Essendon Football Club players
Perth Football Club players
People educated at Wesley College, Perth
Doping cases in Australian rules football
Bendigo Football Club players